Mark Spreitzer (born December 16, 1986) is an American Democratic politician from Beloit, Wisconsin. He is a member of the Wisconsin Senate, representing Wisconsin's 15th State Senate district since January 2023. Spreitzer represented the 45th Assembly district in the Wisconsin State Assembly from 2015 to 2023.

Education 
Spreitzer received his bachelor's degree in political science from Beloit College.

Career 
After graduating from college, Spreitzer worked as the assistant director of alumni and parent relations and annual support at Beloit College. He also served on the Beloit City Council from 2011 to 2015, including as City Council President from 2014 to 2015.

On November 4, 2014, Spreitzer was elected to his first term in the Wisconsin State Assembly to succeed Janis Ringhand. He was reelected in 2016. A Democrat, Spreitzer served on eight committees during the 2015–16 legislative session: Jobs and the Economy, Mining and Rural Development, Natural Resources and Sporting Heritage, Public Benefit Reform, Workforce Development, Joint Committee for Review of Administrative Rules, Speaker's Taskforce on Youth Workforce Readiness, and the Legislative Council Study Committee on Rural Broadband.

Personal life 
Spreitzer is openly gay. He is one of three openly LGBT members of the Wisconsin State Legislature, alongside Senator Tim Carpenter and Representative Todd D. Novak.

References

1986 births
Living people
Politicians from Beloit, Wisconsin
Beloit College alumni
LGBT state legislators in Wisconsin
LGBT people from Wisconsin
Gay politicians
21st-century American politicians
Democratic Party members of the Wisconsin State Assembly
Democratic Party Wisconsin state senators